Velvet plant is a common name for several plants and may refer to:

Gynura aurantiaca, native to southeast Asia
Verbascum